The United States House of Representatives elections in California, 1896 was an election for California's delegation to the United States House of Representatives, which occurred as part of the general election of the House of Representatives on November 3, 1896. Republicans lost one seat to the Democrats and two to the Populists.

Overview

Delegation Composition

Results

District 1

District 2

District 3

District 4

District 5

District 6

District 7

See also
55th United States Congress
Political party strength in California
Political party strength in U.S. states
United States House of Representatives elections, 1896

References
California Elections Page
Office of the Clerk of the House of Representatives

External links
California Legislative District Maps (1911-Present)
RAND California Election Returns: District Definitions

1896
California United States House of Representatives
California